Gone is a 2021 Nigerian emotional and dramatic film written and directed by Daniel Ademinokan. It was co-produced by Joy Odiete and Daniel Ademinokan under the production and distribution company of Blue Pictures Studios  in conjunction with Index Two Studios. The movie stars Ada Ameh, Sam Dede, Bimbo Manuel, Bimbo Ademoye and Emma Oh My God.

Synopsis 
It follows the story of a young man who leaves his pregnant wife in search of better life in New York City. He was arrested amidst mobs and sentenced to twenty five years imprisonment. He returned back to Nigeria after his imprisonment and he discovered his wife had remarried.

Premiere 
The movie was first screened at the five days Calgary Black Film Festival that took place on 26 May to 30 May 2021. The movie was eventually premiered globally on 16 July 2021.

Cast 
 Sam Dede
 Stella Damasus
 Gbenga Titiloye
 Gabriel Afolayan
 Bimbo Ademoye
 Sophie Alakija
 Emma Oh My God
 Aderounmu Adejumoke.

References 

2021 films
Nigerian romantic thriller films
Nigerian romantic drama films
English-language Nigerian films